Menesia fasciolata is a species of beetle in the family Cerambycidae. It was described by Per Olof Christopher Aurivillius in 1922. It is known from Borneo.

References

Menesia
Beetles described in 1922